Alexis Pittas  (born October 31, 1979) is a Cypriot winger who plays for MEAP Nisou. His former teams are Apollon Limassol and AC Omonia where he started his career.

External links
 

1979 births
Living people
Olympiakos Nicosia players
AC Omonia players
Apollon Limassol FC players
Cypriot footballers
Association football forwards
MEAP Nisou players
Cyprus international footballers